Joe Gold (born Sidney Gold; March 10, 1922 – July 11, 2004) was an American bodybuilder and businessman. He was the founder of Gold's Gym and World Gym. He has been credited with being the father of the bodybuilding and the fitness craze.

Early life
Joe Gold was the youngest of four siblings, Robert Gold (born Ruben Gold), Nathan Gold and Eunice Gold Fiss. His parents, Max Gold (born Abraham Mordechai Goldglejt) and Jennie Gold Glick Sussman (born Zelda Feierman) were both Jewish emigrants having relocated from Belarus to Boyle Heights, Los Angeles. Max Gold was the neighborhood junk collector and the family's back yard and garage served as a makeshift junk yard. His mother, Jennie, was a seamstress who  divorced Joe's father and remarried two additional times. Joe attended Theodore Roosevelt High School.

He developed an interest in bodybuilding at the age of 12, when he saw his sister-in-law's design for strengthening her arms. She had attached a filled bucket to each end of a broom handle and was using them as lifts. Joe and his brother, Robert Gold, got the idea for building their own equipment from scrap obtained from their father's scrap yard in Boyle Heights. As a teenager he headed for Muscle Beach in Santa Monica.

A machinist, he worked in the United States Merchant Marine and served in the United States Navy during World War II, where he was badly injured in a torpedo attack, and also in the Korean War.

Career
As a professional bodybuilder, he auditioned for Mae West with a group of musclemen. West approved, saying "I'll take all of you." Gold subsequently toured the country with her revue. He also appeared as an extra in two epic movies, The Ten Commandments and Around the World in 80 Days, both released in 1956.

In 1965, Joe Gold opened the first Gold's Gym in Venice, California. It quickly became a landmark for local bodybuilders despite the dirty fixtures of its first incarnation. Joe Gold was known for the personal encouragement he gave trainers, although delivered in sarcastic jabs at their faults.

Among Joe Gold's many devotees was Arnold Schwarzenegger, who began working out at the gym in 1968 soon after arriving in the US. Schwarzenegger called Joe Gold "a trusted friend and father figure."

Joe Gold opened new gyms and designed the equipment for them. His innovations revolutionized the sport, enabling people to exercise more easily with machines. He sold the Gold's Gym chain in 1970.

In 1977, he launched World Gym in Santa Monica (later in Marina del Rey), which he owned and operated until his death.

Death and legacy
Joe died on July 11, 2004, at age 82, in Marina del Rey.  The first Joe Gold Lifetime Achievement Award was presented to Ric Drasin at the 2012 World Gym International Convention in Las Vegas, Nevada.

See also
List of male professional bodybuilders

References

External links
Gold's Gym Official website
World Gym Official website

1922 births
2004 deaths
Jewish American military personnel
United States Navy personnel of the Korean War
United States Navy personnel of World War II
American sailors
American people of Russian-Jewish descent
Businesspeople from Los Angeles
Jewish American sportspeople
Sportspeople from Los Angeles
People associated with physical culture
People from Marina del Rey, California
20th-century American businesspeople
American bodybuilders
20th-century American Jews
21st-century American Jews
People from Boyle Heights, Los Angeles